Krzysztof Tylkowski (born 25 February 1988) is a Polish bobsledder. He competed in the two-man event at the 2018 Winter Olympics.

References

1988 births
Living people
Polish male bobsledders
Olympic bobsledders of Poland
Bobsledders at the 2018 Winter Olympics
Sportspeople from Poznań